The Estonian language has six locative cases, descended from the locative cases of Proto-Finnic. They can be classified according to a three-way contrast of entering, residing in, and exiting a state, with two sets of cases: inner and outer.

For some nouns, there are two forms of the illative: the regular suffix -sse (e.g. ), added to the genitive stem, and an alternative, short form, which is either consists of a different suffix ( > ) lengthening (e.g.  > , [ko:l] > [ko::li]), and/or other change in the word.  The always regular -sse illative ending is a newer innovation, and can sometimes have a slightly different meaning than the old "short form" illative, the latter having the concrete locative meaning (e.g.:  'into the room'), and the former being used in other structures that require the illative ( 'concerning the room...').

See also
 Proto-Finnic locative system
 Finnish locative system

References

 Moseley, C. (1994). Colloquial Estonian: A Complete Language Course. London: Routledge.
 Oinas, Felix J (1966). Basic Course in Estonian. Bloomington: Indiana University.
 Estonian Language - Estonian Institute
 The Estonian Language Blog
 Eesti keele käsiraamat - Käändsõna

Notes 

Estonian language
Languages of Estonia
Finnic languages
Grammatical cases